These 212 species belong to Leptochilus, a genus of potter and mason wasps in the family Vespidae.

Leptochilus species

 Leptochilus acapulcoensis (Cameron, 1907) c g
 Leptochilus acolhuus (de Saussure, 1857) c g b
 Leptochilus admimulus Gusenleitner, 1993 c g
 Leptochilus aegineticus Gusenleitner, 1970 c g
 Leptochilus alborufulus Gusenleitner, 1977 c g
 Leptochilus alpestris (de Saussure, 1856) c g
 Leptochilus alterego Gusenleitner, 1970 c g
 Leptochilus ambiguus (Kostylev, 1940) c g
 Leptochilus ambitiosus Giordani Soika, 1986 c g
 Leptochilus amos Gusenleitner, 1972 c g
 Leptochilus andalusicus Blüthgen, 1953 c g
 Leptochilus anthracinus Parker, 1966 c g
 Leptochilus arabicus Giordani Soika, 1979 c g
 Leptochilus argentifrons (Kostylev, 1935) c g
 Leptochilus aridulus Parker, 1966 c g
 Leptochilus aterrimus (Kirby, 1900) c g
 Leptochilus atlanticus Berland, 1943 c g
 Leptochilus atriceps Gusenleitner, 1977 c g
 Leptochilus atroscutellatus Giordani Soika, 1952 c g
 Leptochilus autumnus Parker, 1966 c g
 Leptochilus avidus Giordani Soika, 1986 c g
 Leptochilus ayunensis Giordani Soika, 1981 c g
 Leptochilus beaumonti Giordani Soika, 1952 c g
 Leptochilus bellulus (Cresson, 1872) c g b
 Leptochilus bellus Blüthgen, 1955 c g
 Leptochilus biangulatus Gusenleitner, 1977 c g
 Leptochilus boharti Parker, 1966 c g
 Leptochilus brachialis Parker, 1966 c g
 Leptochilus brussiloffi (Dusmet, 1917) c g
 Leptochilus bulsamensis Blüthgen, 1955 c g
 Leptochilus bytinskii Giordani Soika, 1952 c g
 Leptochilus cacaloa Parker, 1966 c g
 Leptochilus californicus Parker, 1966 c g
 Leptochilus callidus (Kostylev, 1940) c g
 Leptochilus camurus (Giordani Soika, 1938) c g
 Leptochilus castilianus Blüthgen, 1951 c g
 Leptochilus chichimecus (de Saussure, 1857) c g
 Leptochilus chinenesis Gusenleitner, 2001 c g
 Leptochilus chinensis Gusenleitner, 2001 c g
 Leptochilus chiricahua Parker, 1966 c g
 Leptochilus chorezmicus (Kostylev, 1940) c g
 Leptochilus conjunctus Gusenleitner, 1998 c g
 Leptochilus covexus Giordani Soika, 1987 c g
 Leptochilus crassiceps (Kostylev, 1940) c g
 Leptochilus crassipunctatus (Maidl, 1922) c g
 Leptochilus crocatus Parker, 1966 c g
 Leptochilus cruentatus (Brullé, 1840) c g
 Leptochilus desertus Gusenleitner, 2001 c g
 Leptochilus discedens Gusenleitner, 1983 c g
 Leptochilus dolius Parker, 1966 c g
 Leptochilus duplicatus (Klug, 1835) c g
 Leptochilus eatoni (E.Saundas, 1905) c
 Leptochilus ebmeri Gusenleitner, 1985 c g
 Leptochilus eburneopictus (Kostylev, 1935) c g
 Leptochilus electus (Cresson, 1872) c g
 Leptochilus ellenae Parker, 1966 c g
 Leptochilus elongatus Parker, 1966 c g
 Leptochilus emirufulus Giordani Soika, 1986 c g
 Leptochilus ergenicus (Kostylev, 1940) c g
 Leptochilus errabundus (Giordani Soika, 1938) c g
 Leptochilus erubescens (Bohart, 1940) c g
 Leptochilus euleptochiloides Giordani Soika, 1977 c g
 Leptochilus exornatus Kurzenko, 1974 c g
 Leptochilus fallax (de Saussure, 1852) c
 Leptochilus ferrugineus Parker, 1966 c g
 Leptochilus festae (Gribodo, 1925) c g
 Leptochilus flavicornis Giordani Soika, 1970 c g
 Leptochilus flegias (Giordani Soika, 1938) c g
 Leptochilus flexilis (Giordani Soika, 1938) c g
 Leptochilus fortunatus Blüthgen, 1958 c g
 Leptochilus frenchi (Dusmet) c g
 Leptochilus fuscipes Gusenleitner, 1985 c g
 Leptochilus gayuboi Sanza 2003 c g
 Leptochilus gemma Giordani Soika, 1970 c g
 Leptochilus gemmeus (Giordani Soika, 1941) c g
 Leptochilus genalis (Giordani Soika, 1941) c g
 Leptochilus gibberus Parker, 1966 c g
 Leptochilus gobicus (Kostylev, 1940) c g
 Leptochilus guichardi Giordani Soika, 1973 c g
 Leptochilus gusenleitneri Yilderim & Özbeck, 1995 c g
 Leptochilus habyrganus Kurzenko, 1977 c g
 Leptochilus hermon Gusenleitner, 1972 c g
 Leptochilus hesperius Gusenleitner, 1979 c g
 Leptochilus hethiticus Gusenleitner, 1985 c g
 Leptochilus hina (Dover, 1925) c g
 Leptochilus humerus Parker, 1966 c g
 Leptochilus ibizanus (Schulthess, 1934) c g
 Leptochilus imerolatus Gusenleitner 2006 c g
 Leptochilus immodestus (Giordani Soika, 1941) c g
 Leptochilus incertus (Kostylev, 1940) c g
 Leptochilus inflatipes Giordani Soika, 1952 c g
 Leptochilus innatus Giordani Soika, 1970 c g
 Leptochilus insitivus Gusenleitner, 1976 c g
 Leptochilus insolitus Gusenleitner, 2003 c g
 Leptochilus irwini Parker, 1966 c g
 Leptochilus isthmus Parker, 1966 c g
 Leptochilus jaxarticus (Kostylev, 1940) c g
 Leptochilus jordaneus Gusenleitner, 1994 c g
 Leptochilus josephi Giordani Soika, 1947 c g
 Leptochilus kemali Gusenleitner, 1977 c g
 Leptochilus kostylevi Kurzenko, 1979 c g
 Leptochilus kozlovi Kurzenko, 1977 c g
 Leptochilus krombeini Parker, 1966 c g
 Leptochilus kurnubensis Blüthgen, 1955 c g
 Leptochilus labrosus Parker, 1966 c g
 Leptochilus lemniscatus Parker, 1966 c g
 Leptochilus leopoldoi Sanza 2003 c g
 Leptochilus levinodus Bohart, 1948 c g
 Leptochilus limbiferoides (Giordani Soika, 1938) c g
 Leptochilus limbiferus (Moravitz, 1867) c g
 Leptochilus linsenmaieri Gusenleitner, 1971 c g
 Leptochilus locuples Giordani Soika, 1970 c g
 Leptochilus longipalpus Gusenleitner, 1985 c g
 Leptochilus longipilis Gusenleitner, 1988 c g
 Leptochilus lorestanicus Gusenleitner, 1995 c g
 Leptochilus lucidus (Giordani Soika, 1941) c g
 Leptochilus lusitanicus Blüthgen, 1953 c g
 Leptochilus maracandicus (Kostylev, 1940) c g
 Leptochilus marshi Parker, 1966 c g
 Leptochilus masiharensis Giordani Soika, 1981 c g
 Leptochilus mauritanicus (Lepeletier, 1841) c
 Leptochilus medanae (Gribodo, 1886) c g
 Leptochilus membranaceus (Moravitz, 1867) c g
 Leptochilus menkei Parker, 1966 c g
 Leptochilus mesolobus Parker, 1966 c g
 Leptochilus metatarsalis Giordani Soika, 1986 c g
 Leptochilus michelbacheri (Bohart, 1948) c g
 Leptochilus milleri Parker, 1966 c g
 Leptochilus mimulus Gusenleitner, 1970 c g
 Leptochilus minutissimus (Bohart, 1940) c g
 Leptochilus mirandus Giordani Soika c g
 Leptochilus mirificus Gusenleitner 2006 c g
 Leptochilus mixtecus Parker, 1966 c g
 Leptochilus mochianus Giordani Soika, 1970 c g
 Leptochilus modestus (de Saussure, 1852) c g
 Leptochilus monticolus Parker, 1966 c g
 Leptochilus montivagus Gusenleitner, 2002 c g
 Leptochilus moustiersensis Giordani Soika, 1973 c g
 Leptochilus moustirsensis Giordani Soika, 1973 g
 Leptochilus muscatensis Giordani Soika, 1979 c g
 Leptochilus nabataeus Gusenleitner, 1990 c g
 Leptochilus nahuus (de Saussure, 1870) c g
 Leptochilus neutraliformis Gusenleitner, 1977 c g
 Leptochilus neutralis (Giordani Soika, 1943) c g
 Leptochilus nigrocitrinus Giordani Soika, 1970 c g
 Leptochilus nigroclypeus Gusenleitner, 1985 c g
 Leptochilus nigromontanus (Kostylev, 1940) c g
 Leptochilus nugdunensis (de Saussure) c g
 Leptochilus occidentalis Giordani Soika, 1986 c g
 Leptochilus occultus Gusenleitner, 2003 c g
 Leptochilus oculatus Parker, 1966 c g
 Leptochilus olmecus (de Saussure, 1870) c g
 Leptochilus oraniensis (Lepeletier, 1841) c g
 Leptochilus ornatulus Gusenleitner, 1977 c g
 Leptochilus ornatus (de Saussure, 1853) c
 Leptochilus osiris (Schmiedeknecht, 1900) c g
 Leptochilus osmanicus Gusenleitner, 1988 c g
 Leptochilus oxianus (Kostylev, 1940) c g
 Leptochilus pachuca Parker, 1966 c g
 Leptochilus paiute Parker, 1966 c g
 Leptochilus palandokenicus Yilderim & Özbeck, 1995 c g
 Leptochilus perialis Parker, 1966 c g
 Leptochilus perterricus Giordani Soika, 1970 c g
 Leptochilus perterritus Giordani Soika c g
 Leptochilus petilus Parker, 1966 c g
 Leptochilus praestans Giordani Soika, 1970 c g
 Leptochilus propodealis Bohart, 1948 c g
 Leptochilus pseudojosephi Giordani Soika, 1952 c g
 Leptochilus pulcher Gusenleitner, 1995 c g
 Leptochilus quintus Gusenleitner, 1991 c g
 Leptochilus quirogae Parker, 1966 c g
 Leptochilus radoschowskii (André, 1884) c g
 Leptochilus ratzenboecki Gusenleitner, 1994 c g
 Leptochilus regulus (de Saussure, 1856) c g
 Leptochilus replenus Giordani Soika, 1974 c g
 Leptochilus republicanus Gusenleitner, 2006 b
 Leptochilus ressli Gusenleitner, 1985 c g
 Leptochilus rivalis Giordani Soika, 1986 c g
 Leptochilus rotundipunctis Giordani Soika 1977 c g
 Leptochilus rubellulus (Kohl, 1906) c g
 Leptochilus rubicundulus (Bohart, 1940) c g
 Leptochilus rufina Blüthgen, 1953 c g
 Leptochilus rufinodus (Cresson, 1868) c g b
 Leptochilus salomon Gusenleitner, 1972 c g
 Leptochilus sarticus Blüthgen, 1939 c g
 Leptochilus schatzmayri (Giordani Soika, 1938) c g
 Leptochilus schindleri (Guiglia, 1929) c g
 Leptochilus sewerzowi (Kostylev, 1940) c g
 Leptochilus signatus Gusenleitner, 1995 c g
 Leptochilus somalicus Giordani Soika, 1987 c g
 Leptochilus sonorae Parker, 1966 c g
 Leptochilus speciosus Gusenleitner, 2002 c g
 Leptochilus stangei Parker, 1966 c g
 Leptochilus subtarsatellus Gusenleitner, 2002 c g
 Leptochilus tarsatellus Giordani Soika, 1970 c g
 Leptochilus tarsatiformis (Giordani Soika, 1943) c g
 Leptochilus tarsatus (de Saussure, 1855) c g
 Leptochilus tassiliensis Giordani Soika, 1954 c g
 Leptochilus tertius Gusenleitner, 1990 c g
 Leptochilus tibetanus Giordani Soika, 1966 c g
 Leptochilus torretassoi (Giordani Soika, 1938) c
 Leptochilus tosquineti (Cameron, 1909) c g
 Leptochilus trachysomus (Bohart, 1940) c
 Leptochilus tropicanus Parker, 1966 c g
 Leptochilus tuareg Gusenleitner 2006 c g
 Leptochilus tussaci Giordani Soika, 1986 c g
 Leptochilus umerolatus Gusenleitner, 2006 g
 Leptochilus villosus Gusenleitner, 2001 c g
 Leptochilus washo Parker, 1966 c g
 Leptochilus weddigeni (Dusmet, 1917) c g
 Leptochilus zacatecus Parker, 1966 c g
 Leptochilus zendalus (de Saussure, 1870) c

Data sources: i = ITIS, c = Catalogue of Life, g = GBIF, b = Bugguide.net

References

Leptochilus